Ricardo Cabanas-Rey (born 17 January 1979) is a Swiss former professional footballer who played as a midfielder. He played 51 international matches for the Switzerland national team.

Club career
Born in Zürich, Cabanas started his career with Grasshoppers Zürich and played there for several seasons, winning two league titles, before moving to 1. FC Köln. During this period, he also enjoyed a loan spell at En Avant de Guingamp.

In June 2007, 1. FC Köln announced that Cabanas was to return to his previous club Grasshoppers for an undisclosed fee.

International career
Cabanas is a member of the Switzerland national team and was called up to the squad which participated in the 2006 World Cup and the Euro 2008. At the 2006 FIFA World Cup he missed a spot-kick during his side's penalty shootout against Ukraine, who emerged victorious. Cabanas has also played for the (non-official) Galicia national team against Iran and against Uruguay.

Personal life
His father, also called Ricardo Cabanas, played for Bellinzona, and for SC Kriens in the 1980–81 season. His brother, Christian Cabanas Rey, also briefly played in the professional league. His cousin, Raúl Cabanas, played with Ricardo at Grasshoppers.

He has two children with his wife Deby.

References

External links

 
  

1979 births
Living people
Swiss people of Galician descent
Swiss people of Spanish descent
Spanish people of Swiss descent
Footballers from Zürich
Association football midfielders
Swiss men's footballers
Swiss expatriate footballers
Switzerland under-21 international footballers
Switzerland international footballers
UEFA Euro 2004 players
2006 FIFA World Cup players
UEFA Euro 2008 players
Expatriate footballers in Germany
Expatriate footballers in France
En Avant Guingamp players
1. FC Köln players
Grasshopper Club Zürich players
Swiss Super League players
Ligue 1 players
Bundesliga players
2. Bundesliga players
Swiss expatriate sportspeople in Germany
Swiss expatriate sportspeople in France